The Lost And Found EP by Royal Wood was released on Dead Daisy Records (2009).

Track listing
 "Don't Fall Apart"
 "Wish to Paint"
 "Thinking About"
 "It Weighs on Me"
 "Poor Little World"
 "All of My Life"

2009 EPs
Royal Wood albums